Elections to Magherafelt District Council were held on 20 May 1981 on the same day as the other Northern Irish local government elections. The election used three district electoral areas to elect a total of 15 councillors.

Election results

Note: "Votes" are the first preference votes.

Districts summary

|- class="unsortable" align="centre"
!rowspan=2 align="left"|Ward
! % 
!Cllrs
! % 
!Cllrs
! %
!Cllrs
! %
!Cllrs
! % 
!Cllrs
! % 
!Cllrs
!rowspan=2|TotalCllrs
|- class="unsortable" align="center"
!colspan=2 bgcolor="" | SDLP
!colspan=2 bgcolor="" | DUP
!colspan=2 bgcolor="" | UUP
!colspan=2 bgcolor="" | IIP
!colspan=2 bgcolor="" | UUUP
!colspan=2 bgcolor="white"| Others
|-
|align="left"|Area A
|bgcolor="#99FF66"|39.1
|bgcolor="#99FF66"|3
|13.0
|1
|9.0
|0
|0.0
|0
|0.0
|0
|38.9
|1
|5
|-
|align="left"|Area B
|10.4
|1
|20.3
|1
|11.9
|1
|bgcolor=#32CD32|33.8
|bgcolor=#32CD32|1
|18.4
|1
|5.2
|0
|5
|-
|align="left"|Area C
|25.8
|1
|bgcolor="#D46A4C"|37.7
|bgcolor="#D46A4C"|2
|9.0
|1
|0.0
|0
|4.6
|0
|22.9
|1
|5
|-
|- class="unsortable" class="sortbottom" style="background:#C9C9C9"
|align="left"| Total
|25.6
|5
|24.0
|4
|9.9
|2
|10.4
|1
|7.3
|1
|22.8
|2
|15
|-
|}

Districts results

Area A

1977: 2 x SDLP, 2 x UUP, 1 x Republican Clubs
1981: 3 x SDLP, 1 x DUP, 1 x Independent Republican
1977-1981 Change: SDLP, DUP and Independent Republican gain from UUP (two seats) and Republican Clubs

Area B

1977: 1 x SDLP, 1 x UUP, 1 x DUP, 1 x UUUP, 1 x Independent Nationalist
1981: 1 x SDLP, 1 x UUP, 1 x DUP, 1 x UUUP, 1 x IIP
1977-1981 Change: IIP gain from Independent Nationalist

Area C

1977: 2 x DUP, 2 x SDLP, 1 x UUP
1981: 2 x DUP, 1 x SDLP, 1 x UUP, 1 x Independent Republican
1977-1981 Change: Independent Republican gain from SDLP

References

Magherafelt District Council elections
Magherafelt